Oskar Rupert Andersson (28 February 1909 – 3 February 1983) was a Swedish footballer who played for Sleipner. He featured once for the Sweden national football team in 1929, scoring a hat-trick against Latvia.

Career statistics

International

International goals
Scores and results list Sweden's goal tally first.

References

1909 births
1983 deaths
Sportspeople from Norrköping
Swedish footballers
Sweden international footballers
Association football forwards
IK Sleipner players
Footballers from Östergötland County